The James P. and Lydia Strang House, at 293 E 400 N in Springville, Utah, was built in 1895.  It was listed on the National Register of Historic Places in 1998.

See also
William and Ann Bringhurst House, NRHP-listed, nearby at 306 S. 200 W, which is incorrect address given in NRHP nomination form for the Strang House

References

Houses on the National Register of Historic Places in Utah
Victorian architecture in Utah
Houses completed in 1895
Houses in Utah County, Utah
National Register of Historic Places in Utah County, Utah
Buildings and structures in Springville, Utah
Individually listed contributing properties to historic districts on the National Register in Utah